Abarema killipii is a species of plant in the family Fabaceae. It is found in Caldas Department, Colombia and on the eastern slope of the Ecuadorean Andes.

References

killipii
Flora of Colombia
Flora of Ecuador
Vulnerable plants
Taxonomy articles created by Polbot